Glenn Paul Rule (born 30 November 1989) is a professional footballer who plays as a midfielder or full back for City of Liverpool.

Career
Born in Birkenhead, Rule attended Woodchurch High School between 2001 and 2006. When he left Woodchurch he signed a youth contract at Chester City and was one of several youngsters who graduated to the first-team squad after 2007. He made his debut as a substitute against Carlisle United in October 2007 as a 17-year-old. His English Football League debut arrived with a starting place at Morecambe on 26 December 2007 and he ended the campaign with four league outings to his name. His first appearance of the following season saw him play at full–back in Chester's 2–1 home defeat by Port Vale on 19 October 2008, going on to enjoy 22 league outings during a campaign which ended in relegation from Football League Two.

Rule was involved in the Chester youth sides that made the fourth round of the FA Youth Cup in both 2006–07 and 2007–08.

He joined Colwyn Bay in 2010, before moving to Stalybridge Celtic. In June 2011 he joined Airbus UK.

On 11 June 2015, Rule joined Stockport County for an undisclosed fee. He received a 10 match ban for allegedly biting an opponent in September 2015.

In January 2017, Rule rejoined Airbus UK. He left the club at the end of the season, signing for Bala Town.

In July 2018 he rejoined former club Stalybridge Celtic.

In 2019, Rule signed for Vauxhall Motors and scored on his debut against Abbey Hey. 

In October 2021 he joined City of Liverpool.

References

External links

1989 births
Living people
English footballers
English Football League players
National League (English football) players
Association football midfielders
Association football fullbacks
Sportspeople from Birkenhead
Chester City F.C. players
Colwyn Bay F.C. players
Stalybridge Celtic F.C. players
Airbus UK Broughton F.C. players
Stockport County F.C. players
Bala Town F.C. players
Cymru Premier players
Vauxhall Motors F.C. players
City of Liverpool F.C. players